Julie Dorne Brown, better known as Downtown Julie Brown, is an English-born actress, television personality, SiriusXM DJ and former MTV VJ. Brown is best known as the host of the television music show Club MTV, which ran from 1987 until 1992.

Life and career
Brown's father was Jamaican and her mother British. Brown has six siblings. Her father was in the Royal Air Force, and she grew up on air force bases all around the world, including Singapore and Cyprus, before returning to the United Kingdom, where they settled in Bridgend, Wales.

After winning the UK Disco Dancing Championships, she went on to win the World Disco Dancing Championship in 1979. Soon after, Brown began a career on British television as presenter and guest on a number of children's programmes, including the long-running show Crackerjack. Brown also appeared as a dancer on Top of the Pops in the early 1980s as a member of the dance troupe Zoo.

Brown became a presenter on the pan-European music channel Music Box and, after moving to the United States, eventually became an MTV VJ and went on to host the Club MTV show in the late 1980s. That show had a format similar to American Bandstand'''s but featured an exclusive lineup of dance music. From this came her catchphrase, "Wubba Wubba Wubba", after she accidentally read the T-shirt of a camera crewmember who was holding the cue cards while on live TV.

MTV capitalized on the confusion between Downtown Julie Brown and comic actress Julie Brown by sending the pair together as correspondents for MTV News as well as by their "facing" each other on both their shows (Club MTV and Just Say Julie).

Later career
After leaving MTV, Brown went on to work for ESPN conducting on- and off-field interviews with football athletes. Brown then moved to Los Angeles to host the E Entertainment channel's gossip show. She also became the host of the syndicated radio program American Dance Traxx in March 1992 until its final broadcast in December 1993.

Brown has appeared in a number of movies and TV shows, including Spy Hard; Spring Break '83; The Weird Al Show; B*A*P*S; Ride; Walker, Texas Ranger; Battle Dome; Hey Arnold!; I'm a Celebrity, Get Me Out of Here!; The Dog Whisperer; The Eric Andre Show; and RuPaul's Drag U.

Most recently, she appeared in television's Wife Swap on 21 July 2013. She also appeared on the cover and posed nude for the August 1998 edition of Playboy''. Brown is currently a host on the SiriusXM channel '90s on 9. In addition to hosting programmes, she also hosts "The Back in The Day Replay Countdown," on which are played the 30 biggest songs of the week from a particular year in the 1990s.

Personal life
Brown married film producer and former CEO of Intermedia Martin Schuermann in 2001. They live in Marina del Rey, California, with their daughter.

References

External links

“Totally Radical Teenage Videos,” The Walter J. Brown Media Archives & Peabody Awards Collection at the University of Georgia, KET - Kentucky Educational Television, American Archive of Public Broadcasting

1963 births
Living people
People from Bridgend
British VJs (media personalities)
British expatriates in the United States
British television presenters
English people of Jamaican descent
British female models
British film actresses
British television actresses
People from Marina del Rey, California
British women television presenters